Cirnik is a small settlement in hills in the Municipality of Mirna in southeastern Slovenia. The municipality is included in the Southeast Slovenia Statistical Region. The entire area is part of the traditional Lower Carniola region.

References

External links

Cirnik on Geopedia

Populated places in the Municipality of Mirna